Tenacibaculum lutimaris is a bacterium. It was first isolated from the Yellow Sea, Korea. It is Gram-negative, rod-shaped and its type strain is TF-26T (=KCTC 12302T =DSM 16505T).

References

Further reading

Lawrence, John M., ed. Sea Urchins: Biology and Ecology. Vol. 38. Academic Press, 2013.
Pavlidis, Michalis, and Constantinos Mylonas, eds. Sparidae: Biology and aquaculture of gilthead sea bream and other species. Wiley. com, 2011.

External links 
LPSN
WORMS entry
Type strain of Tenacibaculum lutimaris at BacDive -  the Bacterial Diversity Metadatabase

Flavobacteria
Bacteria described in 2005